Abram Moiseyevich Deborin (Ioffe) (Upyna, Kovno Governorate – 8 March 1963) was a Soviet Marxist philosopher and academician of the Academy of Sciences of the Soviet Union (1929). Deborin oscillated between The Bolshevik and Menshevik factions of the Russian Social Democratic Labour Party, before settling with the Bolsheviks and enjoying a long career as a philosopher in the Soviet Union. Although this career suffered under Stalin, he lived to see his works republished when the Soviet Union was led by Nikita Khrushchev.

Before the Russian Revolution
Entering the revolutionary movement by the end of the 1890s, Deborin joined the Bolshevik faction of the Russian Social Democratic Labour Party in 1903. By 1907, however, he switched to the Menshevik faction and became known as one of Georgi Plekhanov's disciples, both in politics and philosophy. In 1908, Deborin graduated from the philosophy department at Bern University (L. I. Axelrod had received her doctorate there in 1900). He soon began publishing major books and articles on philosophy from a Marxist perspective. He then wrote "Filosofiia Makha" (Machist Philosophy), published in Golos sotst'aldemokrata, in April 1908. Here he characterized Bolshevism as a political manifestation of the 'subjectivism' and 'voluntarism' inherent in Machism, and that their "tacticians and practical people" were unwitting Machists and idealists. Lenin was one of the practical people who despite his rejection of "machism" had abided by a truce within the Bolshevik faction whereby they agreed not to politicize such philosophical issues.

After the Russian Revolution
Soon after the October Revolution of 1917, Deborin left the Mensheviks and began lecturing at the Sverdlov Communist University, the Institute of Red Professors and the Institute of Philosophy. He soon assumed editorial duties at the journal, Under the Banner of Marxism, which he headed from 1926-1931. Deborin joined the Communist Party in 1928. Following the 1917 October Revolution, Soviet philosophy found itself divided itself between two factions: the "dialecticians," headed up by Deborin, and "mechanists," whose leading figure was the philosopher Lyubov Axelrod (the then prominent Bolshevik leader Nikolai Bukharin was seen as an ally of the "mechanists," although he did not entirely agree with them).

Under Stalin
He was castigated for "Menshevizing idealism."  In 1931, Joseph Stalin decided the issue of the debate between dialecticians and mechanists by publishing a decree which identified dialectical materialism as pertaining solely to Marxism–Leninism. He then codified it in Dialectical and Historical Materialism (1938) by enumerating the "laws of dialectics", which are the grounds of particular disciplines and in particular of the science of history, and which guarantees their conformity to the "proletarian conception of the world". Thus, diamat was imposed on most Communist parties affiliated to the Third International. Diamat became the official philosophy of the Soviet Union and remained as such until its dissolution. When Stalin decided in favor of dialectical materialism, Deborin made a show of support for Stalin's position. For some years afterwards, Deborin kept a low profile, and most of his writings were suppressed. However, he lived long enough to see all of his works republished in the Soviet Union during the "thaw" under Nikita Khrushchev.

References

External links 
 Deborin's Biography
 Deborin's photo – from the Russian Academy of Sciences
 Frederick Choate's website on Deborin
 A. M. Deborin, "Spinoza's World‑View"
 A. M. Deborin, "Hegel And Dialectical Materialism 1929"

1881 births
1963 deaths
20th-century Lithuanian philosophers
20th-century Russian philosophers
People from Rossiyensky Uyezd
People from Šilalė District Municipality
Communist Party of the Soviet Union members
Full Members of the USSR Academy of Sciences
University of Bern alumni
Recipients of the Order of the Red Banner of Labour
Lithuanian Jews
Materialists
Mensheviks
Soviet Jews
Spinoza scholars
Spinozist philosophers
Russian Marxists
Soviet Marxists
Soviet philosophers
Burials at Novodevichy Cemetery